Mark Jermaine Clayton (born July 2, 1982) is a former American football wide receiver who played professionally in the National Football League (NFL). Clayton played college football for Oklahoma from 2001 to 2004. He was drafted by the Baltimore Ravens in the first round of the 2005 NFL Draft and also played for the St. Louis Rams.

Education
Mark Clayton obtained his communications degree in 2010 through the university's degree completion program.

College career
After redshirting in Oklahoma's 2000 national championship season, Clayton's college career began in 2001, when he started 8 of Oklahoma's 13 games, and made 46 catches for 524 yards and 3 touchdowns as the Sooners won the Cotton Bowl Classic. In 2002, he made only one start, but managed 26 receptions for 416 yards, including 5 touchdowns, which tied for the team lead among receivers. In that year, the Sooners won the Big 12 championship as well as the Rose Bowl, a first for any Big 12 team.

His profile exploded in 2003, as he garnered All-American and All-Big 12 honors after a junior season in which he took aim on the school record book. His 83 receptions, 1,425 yards, and 15 touchdowns all smashed previous marks (66, 1,034, and 7, respectively). The quarterback who threw the passes, Jason White, won the Heisman Trophy, and the Sooners advanced to the Sugar Bowl before losing to national champion LSU. Clayton was a Biletnikoff Award finalist. Several of Clayton's "highlight reel" catches during this season demonstrated his ability to gain large numbers of yards after the catch (YAC).

Clayton's 2004 senior year again netted All-America and All-Big 12 recognition, though his 66 receptions, 876 yards, and 8 touchdowns were not quite as eye-popping as the previous season. The Sooners again won the Big 12 championship and played for the national title against USC, though they lost in the Orange Bowl. Clayton set the record for career receiving yards with 3,241.

Professional career

Pre-draft

Baltimore Ravens
Clayton was the 22nd overall selection in the 2005 NFL Draft by the Baltimore Ravens. He started his rookie season slowly due to various injuries but picked up speed during the latter part of the season; a major part of his rehabilitation process was guided by his best friend Christopher Pannozzo. He finished the year with 44 receptions for 471 yards and 2 touchdowns. He also added 8 rushes for 33 yards and a touchdown.

2006

In his second year, his stats improved significantly, with 67 receptions for 939 yards and 5 touchdowns.

2007
In 2007, Clayton had 48 receptions for 531 yards, down from his impressive 2006 season. He dealt with various injuries throughout the 2007 season, but was active for most of it.

2008
In 2008, Clayton had some bright spots during the year. He had 4 catches for 87 yards and a touchdown against the Cleveland Browns, 5 catches for 164 yards and a touchdown against the Cincinnati Bengals, and 4 catches for 128 yards against the Jacksonville Jaguars. The Ravens won each game. Clayton had receptions of 70, 48, and 53 yards.
 
In Week 13, at the division rival Cincinnati Bengals, Clayton had what was arguably the best game of his career. He had five receptions for 164 yards, which included a 70-yard receiving touchdown, the second longest touchdown of his career. He also had one pass attempt on a trick end-around play, which he completed for a 32-yard touchdown pass to fellow wide receiver Derrick Mason, the only touchdown pass of his career. Clayton helped the Ravens rout the Bengals 34–3. 
 
Clayton finished the season with 695 yards on 41 receptions, 3 receiving TDs, 1 rushing TD, and 1 passing TD.

2009
Mark Clayton had his least productive year as a full-time, healthy starter in 2009, as QB Joe Flacco targeted WR Mason, TE Todd Heap, and RB Ray Rice more than Clayton. In fact, Rice led the team in receptions for much of the year. Clayton finished the season with 34 receptions for 480 yards, and 2 scores.

St. Louis Rams

2010
On September 6, 2010, Mark Clayton was traded to the St. Louis Rams along with a 7th round pick in the 2011 NFL Draft in exchange for a 6th round selection in the 2011 NFL Draft. In his first game as a Ram and having only been with the club less than a week Clayton caught 10 passes for 119 yards (two touchdowns) to lead the team in both categories. In Week 5, Clayton was placed on injury reserve with a torn patellar tendon in his right knee, which ended his season. Before the injury, he had emerged as a valued veteran presence on the team, and rookie Sam Bradford's top receiving target. He was re-signed by the Rams on August 31, 2011.

2011
In the 2011 season, Clayton played in two games, starting one, and caught three passes for 26 yards.

Retirement
In May 2013, Clayton announced his retirement from football.  He finished his career with 260 receptions for 3,448 yards and 14 touchdowns.

NFL career statistics

Entrepreneur
Mark Clayton is the founder of Livv Headphones. He also founded a Christian based clothing line called MyChristianT (MCT).

References

External links
MyChristianT.com Business website
CatchClayton89.com Official website
Official bio at BaltimoreRavens.com

1982 births
Living people
Sportspeople from Oklahoma City
African-American players of American football
American football wide receivers
Oklahoma Sooners football players
Baltimore Ravens players
St. Louis Rams players
Players of American football from Oklahoma
21st-century African-American sportspeople
20th-century African-American people